Relatives Menschsein is a German darkwave band formed in 1990 by the musicians Amadeus, Lissy Mödl and Jörg Wolfgram. They are one of the first "Neue Deutsche Todeskunst" (New German Death Art) bands. They were signed 
to label Danse Macabre, founded by the members of Das Ich.

History
Their first singles were a unique blend of music and poetry that became popular in the Darkwave scene.  The songs Tempel, Glaube and Verflucht attracted enough attention for the band to get a record deal with Danse Macabre.  Their first album, Gefallene Engel, was released in Germany in  1992 on Danse Macabre. The album featured six tracks and was produced by Bruno Kramm.

The band's next album, Die Ewigkeit, was released later in 1993. The album featured two more tracks, guest Thar on guitar and was mixed again by Bruno Kramm. Horst Braun also mixed, produced and recorded the album.

The album  Thanatos, released in 2002 on Alice In..., collects the songs from Gefallene Engel and Die Ewigkeit and also features 
live versions and further tracks.

Their last appearance was in 1999, when they officially disbanded.

Line-up
 Amadeus – Vocals
 Lissy Mödl – Lyrics
 Jörg Hüttner – Music and composition
 Jörg Wolfgram – Guitars

Discography

Albums
 1992: Gefallene Engel
 1993: Die Ewigkeit
 2002: Thanatos

Exclusive tracks appearing on compilations
We Came To Dance - Indie Dancefloor Vol. IV – "Die Zeit"
Touched by the Hand of Goth – "Verbotene Triebe"
Künstler Zum 7. Wave-Gotik-Treffen – "Masken"
Wellenreiter In Schwarz Vol. 2 – "Rosa Leidenschaft"
Nachtschwärmer 3 – "Verflucht (Original)"
Extreme Jenseitshymnen 1 - "Ausgeblutet"
Mondenblut 1 – "Passion"

External links
 Official Site (in German)
 
 Relatives Menschsein on Myspace (in German)

German electronic music groups
German dark wave musical groups
Neue Deutsche Todeskunst groups